Michael Farbiarz (born 1973) is an American lawyer from New Jersey who is a nominee to serve as a United States district judge of the United States District Court for the District of New Jersey.

Education 

Farbiarz received a Bachelor of Arts from Harvard University in 1995 and a Juris Doctor from Yale Law School in 1999.

Career 

From 1999 to 2000, he served as a law clerk for then-Chief Judge Michael B. Mukasey of the United States District Court for the Southern District of New York and for Judge José A. Cabranes of the United States Court of Appeals for the Second Circuit from 2000 to 2001. From 2001 to 2004, Farbiarz was an associate at Davis Polk & Wardwell in New York City. From 2004 to 2014, he served  as an assistant United States attorney in the U.S. Attorney's Office for the Southern District of New York,  including as co-chief of the terrorism and international narcotics unit from 2010 to 2014. From 2014 to 2016, Farbiarz was a senior fellow at the New York University School of Law. Since 2016, he has served as general counsel of the Port Authority of New York and New Jersey. In the spring semester of 2014, he co-taught Intelligence, Surveillance, and Privacy at
Columbia University School of Law. In the fall semesters of 2015 and 2014, he taught National Security Law at New York University School of Law. In the spring semester of 2015, he taught National Security Law: Transnational Exercises of American Power at New York University School of Law. In the spring semester of 2016, he taught Criminal Procedure: The Adjudicatory Part, From First Appearance to Post Conviction at New York University School of Law.

Notable cases 

In 2001, Farbiarz prosecuted Mokhtar Haouari, who was convicted of conspiracy in a plot to bomb Los Angeles International Airport shortly before New Year's Day 2000.
In 2009, Farbiarz prosecuted Somali pirates, including Abduwali Muse, who had seized the American container ship Maersk Alabama in the Indian Ocean. The incident was portrayed in the 2013 film Captain Phillips.
In 2010, Farbiarz was the lead prosecutor of eleven deep-cover Russian agents. Anna Chapman, a Russian living in New York, was one of the eleven prosecuted and was charged as a spy.

Nomination to district court 

Farbiarz was recommended by Senator Cory Booker. On December 22, 2022, President Joe Biden announced his intent to nominate Farbiarz to serve as a United States district judge of the United States District Court for the District of New Jersey. On January 3, 2023, his nomination was sent to the Senate. President Biden nominated Farbiarz to the seat vacated by Judge Noel Lawrence Hillman, who assumed senior status on April 4, 2022. On January 25, 2023, a hearing on his nomination was held before the Senate Judiciary Committee. His nomination is pending before the Senate Judiciary Committee.

References 

1973 births
Living people
20th-century American lawyers
21st-century American lawyers
Assistant United States Attorneys
Columbia Law School faculty
Harvard University alumni
Lawyers from New York City
New Jersey lawyers
New York University School of Law faculty
Yale Law School alumni